Alexander Beatson (1758–1830), was an officer in the East India Company's service, governor of St. Helena, and an experimental agriculturist.

Life
He was second son of Robert Beatson, Esq., of Kilrie, Fife County, Scotland, and a nephew or cousin of Robert Beatson. He obtained a cadetship in 1775, and was appointed to an ensigncy in the Madras infantry, 21 Nov. 1776. He served as an engineer officer in the war with Hyder Ali, although he appears never to have belonged to the engineers. As lieutenant, he served with the Guides in Lord Cornwallis's campaigns against Tippu Sultan; and eight years after, as a field officer, was surveyor-general with the army under Lieutenant-general Harris, which captured Seringapatam in 1799. He attained the rank of colonel 1 Jan. 1801.

After leaving India, Beatson was governor of St. Helena from 1808 to 1813. The island, which then belonged to the East
India Company, was in a very unsatisfactory condition. The scanty population had been
nearly swept off by a measles epidemic a short time previously, and, although recruited by emigrants from England and by Chinese coolies, was in a wretched state. The acts of the home authorities in suppressing the spirit traffic and other matters gave rise to great discontent, resulting in a mutiny in 1811, which was put down by the
firmness of Beatson, who also introduced a better system of cultivation and many other
beneficial measures.

After his return to England, he devoted much attention to experiments in agriculture at Knole farm and Henley in Frant, Sussex, near
Tunbridge Wells. He became major-general July 1810, lieutenant-general June 1814, and died 15 October 1830.

Family

On 28 December 1805 he was married to Davidson Reid (sic) (1787–1865) who was 18 at the time of marriage. She returned to family members in Edinburgh after his death and is buried in the churchyard of St John's on Princes Street.

She was born in Kinghorn in Fife the daughter of David Reid and Jean Renny. They had 13 children.

Works
Beatson was the author of the following
works:
An Account of the Isles of France and Bourbon, 1794, which was never printed, and remains in manuscript at the British Museum (Add. MS. 13868).
A View of the Origin and Conduct of the War against Tippoo Sultaun (London, 1800, 4to).
Tracts relative to the Island of St. Helena, with views (London, 1816, 4to)
other smaller works on the island besides contributions to the St. Helena Monthly Register
A New System of Cultivation without Lime or Dung, or Summer Fallowing, as practised at Knole Farm, Sussex (London, 1820, 8vo);
various papers on improvements in agriculture.

References

References marked "via DNB" are from the DNB article but have not been independently verified.
(via DNB) Dodswell and Miles's Alph. Lists Ind. Army
(via DNB) Vibart's Hist, of Madras Sappers and Miners, vol. i.
(via DNB) Beatson's writings.

External links

Attribution

1758 births
1830 deaths
British East India Company Army generals
British military personnel of the Fourth Anglo-Mysore War
People from Fife